Moirangthem Mandakini Devi (born 1 March 1991) is an Indian footballer who plays as a midfielder for Eastern Sporting Union. She has been a member of the India women's national team.

Honours

India
 SAFF Women's Championship: 2014
 South Asian Games Gold medal: 2010

Eastern Sporting Union
 Indian Women's League: 2016–17

Manipur
 Senior Women's National Football Championship: 2019–20, 2021–22

References

1991 births
Footballers from Manipur
Living people
India women's international footballers
Indian women's footballers
People from Thoubal district
Sportswomen from Manipur
Women's association football midfielders
Footballers at the 2014 Asian Games
Asian Games competitors for India
Eastern Sporting Union players
Indian Women's League players
South Asian Games gold medalists for India
South Asian Games medalists in football